Troy Adams (born 1961) is a real estate developer and award winning interior designer based in Los Angeles, California. He’s renowned for his grand scale thinking, and fusion approach taking the best materials from around the globe and combining them to spectacular effect.  He has been featured in newspapers, magazines, websites and TV appearances such as Oprah and HGTV's Designer Challenge for his interior and product design concepts. Adams is also the creator of FusionDesign.

History
Adams was born on October 18, 1961 and grew up in Wasilla, Alaska. He attended Wasilla High School and worked in construction in Alaska before moving to Hawaii. During this 17-year tenure he was commissioned to design a villa in Ubud, Bali where he envisioned and created the FusionDesign concept for the first time.

He has also designed spaces in Guam, Saipan, the Hawaiian islands, as well as Norway and England. In Germany he learned about German design techniques and aesthetics that he implements in his designs and executions today. He also spent time in Italy exploring kitchens and becoming immersed in Italian kitchen design.

Troy has three sons, and is now based out of Southern California while working on projects both domestically and internationally

Design concepts 
Adams is known for a number of interior design concepts including his trademarked FusionDesign concept which blends European standards of sophisticated and technological minimalist design with both the American principles of functionality and the Zen qualities of Asian cultures. The concept of FusionDesign was first thought of and implemented in 2000 as a commissioned project for a villa in Ubud, Bali which was built on a rice paddy. Unlike other design concepts, FusionDesign uses natural materials including basalt, lava stone, bamboo, cork flooring and stainless steel. FusionDesign also uses open space concepts as well as hidden compartment and hideaway areas to increase both the actual and apparent size of the spaces used.

FusionDesign is a contemporary style built upon an abiding respect for nature with inspiration from Asian and Pacific Rim cultures that place a premium on these values too. After traveling and designing spaces in Guam, Bali and Saipan, Mr. Adams was inspired to create this original design concept.

Another unique design concept implemented by Adams has been labeled as the "kitchen within a kitchen" concept. Although this concept is not necessarily new, and was first implemented in the 1960s, Adams is one of the innovators who is bringing it back to the kitchen in a more modern fashion. This "kitchen within a kitchen" concept, requires that there is an entertainment kitchen which opens into the main living area and an adjoining professional-style kitchen that can be tucked away behind closed sliding doors. This allows for dirty dishes, food preparation and cooking utensils to remain out of sight to guests as they are 'contained' in the hidden kitchen. When the food is more presentable, it can then be transferred to the visible kitchen.

The concept is similar to a Japanese tradition commonly found in high-end homes, where two kitchens serve two different purposes. In Japanese high-end homes, the visible entertainment kitchen is where hosts socialize while engaging in light food prep, and where the utensils and appliances are mostly hidden. The cooking staff or caterers occupy the hidden kitchen, which is concealed behind closed doors for food production and cleanup.

Other design concepts are used by Adams such as integrated fronts and hydraulic lift, kitchen island storage,  in order to hide appliances and create a minimalistic visual aesthetic while maintaining all the practical functionality of a high end, modern home.

By applying over forty years of experience in all areas of high end real estate design and development, Mr. Adams is now developing his own real estate projects under the Troy Adams Brand. After identifying and analyzing a market, he scouts locations and decides where the next Troy Adams home will be developed. Currently, he is developing projects in Boise, Idaho, which was recently named top cities to move to by US News, Curbed and Business Insider.

References 

American interior designers
Living people
1961 births